Martina Evans (born 1961) is an Irish poet and novelist living in London.

Biography
Evans (née Cotter) was born in Burnfort, County Cork in 1961, the youngest of ten children. Her parents had a shop, bar and petrol pumps in the village. Her interest was in English literature but her parents wanted her to train as a radiographer. 
She trained in Dublin and after marriage, emigrated with her husband to London. She worked in Whittington Hospital for 15 years and did a degree in English and Philosophy with the Open University. She wrote intermittently during that period, but it was after her father's death in 1988 which released a burst of poetry that she turned to literature full-time. For some years she taught creative writing at institutions such as Birkbeck, University of London and the City Literary Institute, London. 

She has judged various literary competitions including the London Arts Board Awards and the Listowel short story competition. She was Children's Book Editor at the Irish Post from 1998 to 2009.
She is a Royal Literary Fund Advisory Fellow and reviews for the Irish Times.

Of her own creative process, Evans has said: "Memory is the muse" and "Time is the best editor".

Works

Poetry
 Iniscarra Bar and Cycle Rest, Rockingham Press, 1995
 All Alcoholics are Charmers, Anvil Press Poetry, 1998
 Can Dentists be Trusted? Carcanet Press, 2004
 Facing the Public, Anvil Press Poetry, 2009 
 Burnfort, Las Vegas, Anvil Press Poetry,2014 
 The Windows of Graceland: New and Selected Poems, Carcanet Press, 2016. 
 Now We Can Talk Openly About Men, Carcanet Press,2018
 American Mules, Carcanet Press. 2021.

Novels
 Midnight Feast, Sinclair-Stevenson 1996, Vintage 1998
 The Glass Mountain, Sinclair-Stevenson 1997, Vintage 1998
 No Drinking, No Dancing, No Doctors, Bloomsbury, 2001

Prose poems
 Petrol, Anvil Press, 2012
 The Glass Mountain, Bloom Books, 2013

Awards
 1995  Betty Trask Award for Midnight Feast
 1999 Arts Council England award for No Drinking, No Dancing, No Doctors.
 2011 International Premio Piero Ciampi prize for poetry for Facing the Public.
 in 2015 the narrative poem Mountainy Men , later published in American Mules, received a Grant for the Arts Award.
 In 2018 Now We Can Talk Openly About Men was a Book of the year for the Observer, TLS and Irish Times.
 In 2019 Now We Can Talk Openly About Men was shortlisted for the Irish Times Poetry Now Award, the Pigott Poetry Prize and the Roehampton Poetry Prize.
 In 2022 American Mules won the Pigott Poetry Prize.

References

External links
 martinaevans.com

1961 births
Living people
Irish poets
Irish women poets
People from County Cork
Irish emigrants to the United Kingdom